Founded in 1972, The Steward School is a private day school in the suburbs of Richmond, Virginia.

Campus

Athletics
Steward School participates in: soccer, basketball, baseball, volleyball, tennis, lacrosse, cross country, golf, field hockey, Swim and Dive, and cheerleading. All of the teams compete in the Tidewater Conference for Independent Schools and the Virginia Independent Schools Athletic Association. Stewards girls tennis are state champions as of 2019.

References

External links

Private elementary schools in Virginia
Private middle schools in Virginia
Private high schools in Virginia
Schools in Richmond, Virginia
Educational institutions established in 1972
Preparatory schools in Virginia